Hossein Malek-Afzali (born 1939) is an Iranian scientist, physician, and an associate of World Health Organization.

He is currently professor at the Department of Biostatistics and Epidemiology, School of Public Health, Tehran University. He also acted as deputy health minister of Iran.

Malek-Afzali is the author of more than 80 articles in international journals and several books in English and Persian.

In 2007, the United Nations awarded him with the prestigious UN Population Award. Malek Afzali has helped design strategies to improve health procedures, particularly adolescent health, reproductive health and family planning. In the field of reproductive health, he has engaged policymakers and religious leaders in the planning and implementation of reproductive health programmes in Iran.

Awards
 United Nations Population Award (2007)

Notes

See also
 Intellectual movements in Iran
 Contemporary Medicine in Iran

Iranian public health doctors
20th-century Iranian inventors
Iranian Vice Ministers
Academic staff of the University of Tehran
World Health Organization officials
1939 births
Living people
Iranian officials of the United Nations